Petrophila opulentalis is a moth in the family Crambidae. It was described by Julius Lederer in 1863. It is found in the West Indies, Colombia and Brazil.

References

Petrophila
Moths described in 1863